Bāng Chhun-hong is a Taiwanese Hokkien song composed by Teng Yu-hsien, a Hakka Taiwanese musician, and written by Lee Lin-chiu. The song was one of their representative works. It was released by the Columbia Records in 1933, and originally sung by some female singers at that time, such as Sun-Sun,  or Iam-Iam. The title literally means "Longing for the Spring Breeze".

Bāng Chhun-hong was once adapted into a Japanese patriotic song as "Daichi wa maneku", literally means "The Mother Earth is Calling on You". The song has also been released in Japan by Hitoto Yo, a Japanese pop singer. Many Taiwanese singers have covered the song, such as Teresa Teng, Showlen Maya, Feng Fei-fei, Stella Chang, and David Tao.

Bāng Chhun-hong has frequently been used as background music in Taiwanese films or teleplays. It is also a theme in the soundtrack of Singapore Dreaming, a 2006 released Singaporean film.

There is a biographical novel of the same name that written by Chung Chao-cheng, a Hakka writer. The novel does not describe about the song, instead, it depicts the life of Teng Yu-hsien, the composer.

Lyrics

Original lyric

Present-day lyric

† In the modern version, the word Go̍at-ló (Yue Lao, a god of marriage), is replaced by go̍eh-niû (moon).

Media

See also
Taiwanese pop

References

External links

Southern Min-language songs
Taiwanese songs
1933 songs
Songs with music by Teng Yu-hsien
+